West Jersey and East Jersey were two distinct parts of the Province of New Jersey. The political division existed for 28 years, between 1674 and 1702. Determination of an exact location for a border between West Jersey and East Jersey was often a matter of dispute.

Background
The Delaware Valley had been inhabited by the Lenape (or Delaware) Indians prior to European exploration and settlement starting around 1609, undertaken by the Dutch, Swedish and English. The Dutch West India Company had established one or two Delaware River settlements, but by the late 1620s, it had moved most of its inhabitants to the island of Manhattan. This became the center of New Netherland. West Jersey and East Jersey were two sections of New Jersey.

The development of the colony of New Sweden in the lower Delaware Valley began in 1638. Most of the Swedish population was on the west side of the Delaware. After the English re-established New Netherland's Fort Nassau to challenge the Swedes, the latter constructed Fort Nya Elfsborg in present-day Salem County. Fort Nya Elfsborg was located between present day Salem and Alloway Creek. The New Sweden colony established two primary settlements in New Jersey: Sveaborg, now Swedesboro, and Nya Stockholm, now Bridgeport. Trinity Church, located in Swedesboro, was the site of the Church of Sweden for the area.

The Dutch defeated New Sweden in 1655. Settlement of the West Jersey area by Europeans was thin until the English conquest in 1664. Beginning in the late 1670s, Quakers settled in great numbers in this area, first in present-day Salem County and then in Burlington. The latter became the capital of West Jersey.

Before 1674, land surveyors for New Jersey considered it as a hundred and partitioned it into tenths. West Jersey comprised five of the tenths. But demarcation of the boundaries awaited settlement, the quit-rents the settlers would pay, and the land surveying which the money would purchase. Thus it took years and multiple surveys to settle boundary disputes. Burlington County was formed on May 17, 1694 by combining the first and second tenths. At least three surveys were conducted of West Jersey. Richard Tindall was surveyor-general of Fenwick's Colony, the fifth tenth.

Constitution
See: History of the New Jersey State Constitution#West Jersey Constitution

See also
 Colonial history of New Jersey
 Concession and Agreement
 Lords Proprietor (1665–1703)
 List of colonial governors of New Jersey#Governors under the Proprietors (1665–1674)
 Newton Colony
 Province of New York
 Dominion of New England
 West Jersey and Seashore Railroad

References

Further reading 

 Weslager, C. A. Dutch Explorers, Traders, and Settlers in the Delaware Valley, 1609–1644. (Philadelphia, University of Pennsylvania Press, 1961).
 Johnson, Amandus The Swedish Settlements on the Delaware Volume I: Their History and Relation to the Indians, Dutch and English, 1638–1664 (Philadelphia: Swedish Colonial Society. 1911)

External links
 West Jersey History Project
 Quaker West New Jersey: Democracy in 1677
 1677 Charter
 1681 Regulations
 Where was the West Jersey/East Jersey line?
 Colonial Charters, Grants and Related Documents (at "New Jersey"). 

Pre-statehood history of New Jersey
History of the Thirteen Colonies
Dominion of New England
Former regions and territories of the United States
States and territories established in 1674
Colonial United States (British)
1674 establishments in New Jersey
Former English colonies